Jackson Township is a township in Linn County, in the U.S. state of Missouri.

Jackson Township was established in 1845, and most likely was named after Andrew Jackson (1767–1845), a general in the War of 1812 and afterward 7th U.S. president.

References

Townships in Missouri
Townships in Linn County, Missouri